Young and Restless may refer to:

The Young and the Restless, an American television soap opera running since 1973
Young and Restless (hip hop band), a hip-hop duo famous in the early 1990s
Young and Restless (Australian band), a band from Canberra, Australia formed in 2005
 Young and Restless (Young and Restless album), 2007
Young & Restless (Kristinia DeBarge album), 2013
Young and Restless (Prism album), 1980

See also
 Young & Reckless (disambiguation)